United States v. Shi, 525 F.3d 709 (9th Cir. 2008) is a case involving piracy on the high seas. The case held that United States could try foreign nationals on foreign-flagged vessels for crimes committed on the high seas, outside the territory of the United States.

Incident and capture of the Full Means II
A national of the People's Republic of China, Shi Lei (施雷), the cook of the Full Means II (富明二號), a Taiwanese fishing vessel registered in the Republic of the Seychelles and owned by Taipei-based FCF Fishery Company (豐群水產股份有限公司), had been demoted to deckhand. He had demanded to go home to China but was refused. In retaliation, he stabbed and killed Captain Chen Chung-She (陳忠社 Chén Zhōngshè) and first mate Li Da Feng (李大丰/李大豐) when the ship was sailing in international waters off the coast of Hawaii on March 14, 2002. After killing the men Shi ordered the second mate to "drive the ship," and ordered the other crewmembers to throw the captain's body overboard. He allegedly stated that he would kill anyone who disobeyed him and refused to let his crewmates use the radio. He controlled the ship for two days, setting a course for China and threatening to scuttle the vessel if his instructions were not obeyed.

However, on March 16, 2002, the crew overpowered Shi, and imprisoned him in a storage compartment. The crew then set a course for Hawaii, but did not contact FCF, apparently because none of them knew how to operate the radio. FCF notified the U.S. Coast Guard that its ship was missing, as the company had not heard from the ship for several days, and asked the Coast Guard to help find it.

Five days after Shi had seized the ship, a Coast Guard cutter Kiska intercepted the ship approximately 60 miles from Hilo, Hawaii. Over the next two days, Shi, who was still imprisoned by the crew in the storage compartment, spoke to a Coast Guard officer and admitted to having killed the two men. FBI agents then boarded the ship and arrested Shi; he was arrested for violating 18 U.S.C. § 2280, which prohibits acts of violence that endanger maritime navigation.

Trial and decision
The Seychelles waived its jurisdiction. Instead, the United States federal government prosecuted Shi.

Shi was charged with one count of seizing control over a ship by force resulting in death, and two counts of performing an act of violence likely to endanger the safety of the ship resulting in death. After a jury trial before U.S. District Judge Helen W. Gillmor of the District of Hawaii, Shi was convicted and sentenced to 36 years in prison.

The U.S. Attorney General did not authorize a death sentence in this case, albeit this had been requested by the prosecuting attorney.

Shi appealed, challenging, among other things, the district court's jurisdiction. However, in 2008 the United States Court of Appeals for the Ninth Circuit, in an opinion by Judge Diarmuid F. O'Scannlain, rejected Shi's claims that he cannot be tried in the USA because piracy is subject to universal jurisdiction, and because Sec. 2280 implements the Convention for the Suppression of Unlawful Acts Against the Safety of Maritime Navigation — to which the United States is a party – which expressly provides notice that prohibited conduct may be prosecuted by any state signatory.

, Shi, listed as "Lei Shi" in the Federal Bureau of Prisons (BOP) register under number 88784-022, is incarcerated at FCI Yazoo City Low in Mississippi. He is scheduled for release on March 17, 2033.

References

External links

Gima, Craig. "Appeals panel upholds conviction for acts of piracy." Honolulu Star Bulletin. April 25, 2008.
 "Cook `innocent' of boat murders." Associated Press at the Taipei Times. Wednesday April 10, 2002. Page 2.
 "Chinese mutineer charged in Hawaii." Associated Press at Taipei Times. Sunday March 2, 2002. Page 2.
 Altonn, Helen. "Chinese crew glad to be docked after killings." Honolulu Star-Bulletin. Sunday March 24, 2002.
 Lisl, Clemente. "‘PIRATE’ SEIZED AFTER MUTINY." New York Post. March 24, 2002.
 Chung, T.Y. "Chamber Responds to Plight of Crew. Lantern (newsletter), Chinese Chamber of Commerce of Hawaii. April 2002. p. 4.

United States Court of Appeals for the Ninth Circuit cases
United States federal criminal case law
United States piracy case law
 
2002 crimes
2008 in United States case law
People convicted of murder by the United States federal government